Kooraikundu is a panchayat town in Virudhunagar district in the Indian state of Tamil Nadu.

Demographics
 India census, Kooraikundu had a population of 19,706. Males constitute 50% of the population and females 50%. Kooraikundu has an average literacy rate of 73%, higher than the national average of 59.5%: male literacy is 78%, and female literacy is 68%. In Kooraikundu, 12% of the population is under 6 years of age.

Adjacent communities

Reference 

Cities and towns in Virudhunagar district